Grant Nelson may refer to:

Grant Nelson (basketball) (born 2002), American basketball player
Grant Nelson (disc jockey) (born 1971), British disc jockey and producer
Grant S. Nelson (born 1939), American professor